The Turukhan is a river in northern Krasnoyarsk Krai in Russia. It is a southeast-flowing left tributary of the Yenisey. The Turukhan freezes up in October and stays under the ice until late May or the first half of June. Its main tributaries are the Usomchik, Bolshaya Bludnaya, Verkhnyaya Baikha and Nizhnyaya Baikha from the right and Makovskaya from the left. It was part of the canoe route from the Gulf of Ob – Taz – Turukhan – Yenisey – Nizhnyaya Tunguska – Yakutsk (see Siberian River Routes). The uncompleted Salekhard–Igarka Railway from the Ob to the Yenisey was planned to cross the Turukhan at Yanov Stan.

See also
List of rivers of Russia

References

Rivers of Krasnoyarsk Krai